The Bornean wren-babbler (Ptilocichla leucogrammica) is a species of bird in the family Pellorneidae. It is found in Brunei, Indonesia, and Malaysia, where it is endemic to the island of Borneo. Its natural habitats are subtropical or tropical moist lowland forest and subtropical or tropical swampland. It is threatened by habitat loss.

References

Collar, N. J. & Robson, C. 2007. Family Timaliidae (Babblers)  pp. 70 – 291 in; del Hoyo, J., Elliott, A. & Christie, D.A. eds. Handbook of the Birds of the World, Vol. 12. Picathartes to Tits and Chickadees. Lynx Edicions, Barcelona.

Ptilocichla
Endemic birds of Borneo
Birds described in 1850
Taxa named by Charles Lucien Bonaparte
Taxonomy articles created by Polbot